Uthiramerur Taluk is a taluk in Kanchipuram district of the Indian state of Tamil Nadu. The headquarters of the taluk is the town of Uthiramerur.

Demographics
According to the 2011 census, the taluk of Uthiramerur had a population of 145,376 with 72,828  males and 72,548 females. There were 996 women for every 1000 men. The taluk had a literacy rate of 67.75. Child population in the age group below 6 was 7,537 Males and 7,144 Females.

See also 

 Pinayur

References

Taluks of Kanchipuram district